The Banana Splits is an American television variety show produced by Hanna-Barbera Productions and featuring the Banana Splits, a fictional rock band composed of four costumed animal characters in red marching band hats with yellow plumes. The costumed hosts of the show are Fleegle (guitar, vocals), Bingo (drums, vocals), Drooper (bass, vocals) and Snorky (keyboards, effects).

The series ran for 31 episodes on NBC Saturday mornings from September 7, 1968, to September 5, 1970, and in syndication from 1970 to 1982. The show features the Banana Splits band as live-action costumed characters, who host both live-action and animated segments within their program. The costumes and sets were designed by Sid and Marty Krofft, and the series' sponsor was Kellogg's Cereals.

A feature-length comedy horror film adaptation called The Banana Splits Movie premiered at the San Diego Comic-Con on July 18, 2019, and was released worldwide on August 27, 2019.

History
In 1967, William Hanna and Joseph Barbera approached Sid and Marty Krofft to design costumes for a television show featuring animated and live-action segments, hosted by a bubblegum rock group of anthropomorphic characters. The show's format was loosely based on Rowan & Martin's Laugh-In. (The characters later appeared on one episode of that show.) The Banana Splits Adventure Hour premiered on NBC on September 7, 1968. In his autobiography, Barbera said that the show was originally going to be called The Banana Bunch, but permission could not be obtained from the author of a children's book by that same title.

The Krofft brothers credit the series' success for making possible their own entry into television, H.R. Pufnstuf. NBC picked up the Krofft series, which was launched on August 30, 1969, during an hour-long special hosted by the Banana Splits.

The show's live-action segment Danger Island, a cliffhanger serial, as well as the short-lived Micro Ventures, a part-live action, part-animated series consisting of only four episodes, ran alongside the animated segments Arabian Knights and The Three Musketeers. Actors Jan-Michael Vincent (billed as Michael Vincent) and Ronne Troup appeared in the live-action component Danger Island. All the live-action material filmed for the series' first season, including the Banana Splits and Danger Island segments, was directed by Richard Donner.

Jason Ankeny of AllMusic has blamed the show's drastic ratings drop during its second season on the production staff's failure to change backgrounds or set designs, which misled young viewers into thinking that they were watching reruns instead of new episodes.

Synopsis
Each show represented a meeting of the Banana Splits Club, and the wraparounds featured the adventures of the club members, a musical quartet meant to be reminiscent of the Monkees.

The Splits' segments, including songs of the week and comedy skits, served as wraparounds for a number of individual segments.

For the first season, some of the live-action segments—specifically those used during the musical segments—were shot at Six Flags Over Texas, an amusement park in Arlington, Texas. For the second season, filming took place at the Coney Island amusement park in Cincinnati, Ohio. In many episodes, the Banana Splits were seen riding the many rides at Six Flags and Coney Island.

The Banana Buggies, mentioned in the theme song, were customized vehicles driven by each live-action character. The buggies were customized Amphicat six-wheel drive all-terrain vehicles, each decorated to resemble the character who drove it. Plastic 1/25 scale model kits were issued by Aurora Plastics Corporation (catalog number 832) beginning in 1969. They were never reissued by Aurora, but have since been released as high-end resin-based kits.

The Banana Splits was one of the first two Hanna-Barbera series in 1968 for which Hanna and Barbera received executive producer credits, the other being The New Adventures of Huckleberry Finn; Edward Rosen was the producer on both series. It was also one of the first Saturday morning shows to utilize a laugh track, but only during the live-action comedy segments. In its first year, the cartoons were adventure-based and did not have laugh tracks. (The first Saturday morning cartoon with a laugh track was Filmation's The Archie Show.)

Characters

Main
 Fleegle – A dog with a lisp and the Splits' self-proclaimed leader. Performed on-screen by Jeff Winkless (1968), Ginner Whitcombe (2008), and Terry Sauls (2019 film); voiced by Paul Winchell (1968–1972), Keith Scott (2008), Eric Bauza (2019 film) and Paul F. Tompkins (in Jellystone!).
 Bingo – A nasal-voiced orange ape wearing white sunglasses and a yellow vest. Performed on-screen by Terence H. Winkless (1968), Casey Hadfield (2008) and Buntu Plam (2019 film); voiced by Daws Butler (1968–1972), Keith Scott (2008), Eric Bauza (2019 film) and Jim Conroy (in Jellystone!).
 Drooper – A Southern-accented lion with a long tail wearing yellowish-orange sunglasses. Performed on-screen by Anne W. Withrow (1968), Adam Grubner (2008), and Kori Clarke (2019 film); voiced by Allan Melvin (1968–1972), Karl Wiedergott (2008), Eric Bauza (2019 film) and C.H. Greenblatt (in Jellystone!).
 Snorky – An elephant wearing pink sunglasses who communicates through honking noises. Originally covered in shaggy fur, he was redesigned for the second season to more resemble an elephant. Performed on-screen by James Dove and Robert Towers (1968–2008) and Brandon Vraagom (2019 film).

Secondary
 Announcer – an unseen narrator who introduced the Banana Splits and certain acts. Voiced by Allan Melvin (1968–1972) and Eric Bauza (2019 film).
 The Banana Vac – A blue moose-like head with brown hair and light bulbs on his head. He hangs over the entrance of the clubhouse making various comments and often helps the Splits introduce segments. Voiced by Allan Melvin.
 Cuckoo Clock – A clock with a blue and yellow bird head inside that gave snarky answers when asked "What time is it?", and helped the Splits introduce segments. Voiced by Paul Winchell.
 Goofy Gopher – A gopher who lived in a flower pot. Voiced by Paul Winchell, it was created for the show's second season.
 Mildred the Robot - An invention of Fleegle's that could grant wishes, often literally. "Performed" by Robby the Robot
 The Sour Grapes Bunch – A group of silent human girl characters who were all named Charley (portrayed by Sheri Freeman). The Splits' rivals, they took turns bringing written notes to the Splits. They danced one song with the title characters. In the first season, on October 5, 1968, the song "Doin' the Banana Split" had all five girls appear with the hosts.
 The Dilly Sisters (Nelly and Miriam) – Two human girls who played acoustic classical guitars and sang two songs: "The Mexican Hat Dance" and "Ta-ra-ra Boom-de-ay".

Segments
The show had four segments:

 Arabian Knights – Prince Turhan (voiced by Jay North), his cousin Princess Nida (voiced by Shari Lewis), and their allies Fariik the Magician (voiced by John Stephenson), Raseem the Strong (voiced by Frank Gerstle), his donkey Zazuum (voiced by Don Messick), and shapeshifter Bez (voiced by Henry Corden) work to free Persia from the evil Bakaar the Black Sultan (voiced by John Stephenson) and his enforcer Vangore (voiced by Paul Frees).
 The Three Musketeers – Based on the novel of the same name. Athos (voiced by Jonathan Harris), Porthos (voiced by Barney Phillips), Aramis (voiced by Don Messick), and D'Artagnian (voiced by Bruce Watson) partake in new adventures fighting the enemies of the crowned heads of France King Louis XIV (voiced by Don Messick) and Queen Anne (voiced by Julie Bennett). They are sometimes assisted by a queen's handmaid named Lady Constance Bonacieux (voiced by Julie Bennett) and her young nephew Tooly (voiced by Teddy Eccles).
 Danger Island – The show's only live-action segment. This adventure serial depicts archaeologist Professor Irwin Hayden (portrayed by Frank Aletter), his assistant Lincoln "Link" Simmons (portrayed by Jan Michael Vincent), and his daughter Leslie (portrayed by Ronne Troup) having adventures on an unnamed island chain with a shipwrecked merchant mariner named Elihu Morgan (portrayed by Rockne Tarkington) and his sidekick Chongo (portrayed by Kim Kahana) as they avoid a group of bumbling yet heavily armed modern day pirates led by Captain Mu-Tan (portrayed by Victor Eberg).
 Micro Ventures – A four-episode segment where Professor Carter (voiced by Don Messick) and his children Jill (voiced by Patsy Garrett) and Mike (voiced by Tommy Cook) use a shrinking machine to shrink themselves and their dune buggy to miniature size to explore and experience the world from the perspective of an insect.

In the second season, The Three Musketeers segments were replaced with reruns of The Hillbilly Bears, a cartoon segment that previously appeared on The Atom Ant Show (1965–1968). In reruns, episodes of The Atom Ant/Secret Squirrel Show, The Adventures of Gulliver, and The New Adventures of Huckleberry Finn were aired on the show.

The Banana Splits was syndicated in 1970 to local stations under the title of The Banana Splits and Friends Show, but with several other series included in a package deal. All the Banana Splits episodes were syndicated in this package alongside The New Adventures of Huckleberry Finn, The Atom Ant Show, The Secret Squirrel Show, and The Adventures of Gulliver.

Music

The show's theme song, "The Tra La La Song (One Banana, Two Banana)", was credited to Ritchie Adams and Mark Barkan, but that was merely contractual. It was written by N. B. Winkless Jr., on the upright piano in his living room—a piano that also spawned the "Snap, Crackle, Pop" jingle, among other successful themes. Adams and Barkan were the show's music directors. The song, a single attributed to The Banana Splits, peaked at #96 on Billboards Top 100 in February 1969. The version included on the We're The Banana Splits album is the same heard at the beginning of the show, while the single version is an entirely different arrangement and recording, with an additional verse.

The Banana Splits' bubblegum pop rock and roll was provided by studio professionals, including Joey Levine ("I Enjoy Being a Boy", "It's a Good Day for a Parade"); Al Kooper ("You're the Lovin' End"); Barry White ("Doin' the Banana Split"); Gene Pitney ("Two Ton Tessie") and Jimmy Radcliffe, who provided his songs ("I'm Gonna Find a Cave", "Soul", "Don't Go Away Go-Go Girl", "Adam Had 'Em" and "The Show Must Go On") but did not contribute vocals to Splits recordings.

The music director was music publisher Aaron Schroeder; production duties were mainly handled by David Mook. When a heavier R&B vocal was needed, the music producers usually turned to singer Ricky Lancelotti, who was credited under his stage name Rick Lancelot. He went on to record several songs with Frank Zappa. In 1968, The Banana Splits released an album on Decca Records titled We're the Banana Splits.

An unusual claim is that the song may have inspired Bob Marley, with the striking similarity between the song's chorus and the bridge of the Bob Marley and the Wailers song "Buffalo Soldier". A 2010 BBC story examined the claim.

Covers
US punk rock act the Dickies covered the theme song in 1978 as "Banana Splits (Tra La La Song)". It reached #7 on the UK charts and appeared as a bonus on the CD reissue of their 1979 album The Incredible Shrinking Dickies.

Comics
The Banana Splits' adventures continued in comic books. Gold Key began publishing a comic version in 1969, releasing eight issues through 1971. Drawn by Jack Manning, these stories followed the musicians either trying to find work or on the road between gigs.

The Banana Splits had a crossover with the Suicide Squad in Suicide Squad/Banana Splits #1 on March 29, 2017.

Other projects
Made-for-television film
Hanna-Barbera produced The Banana Splits in Hocus Pocus Park, a televised feature film, for ABC in 1972 that has the group rescuing a girl from an evil witch.

Educational films
 Hanna-Barbera Educational Filmstrips
 The Banana Splits: Healthy and Happy (1978)
 The Banana Splits: We Have Five Senses (1978)
 The Banana Splits: Safety First (1978)
 The Banana Splits: It's a Sense-sational World (1979)
 The Banana Splits: Meet the Microbes (1980)
 Learning Tree Filmstrip Set
 Learning About Holidays with The Banana Splits (1982)

2008 revival
In August 2008, Warner Bros. Consumer Products announced a multi-platform release featuring new comedy shorts/series and music videos. It debuted on Cartoon Network on September 2, 2008. Keith Scott voiced Fleegle and Bingo, and Karl Wiedergott voiced Drooper. It included a live show and a website, as well as a CD and a DVD featuring 13 new songs, released by Universal Records. a child-themed area, Banana Splitsville,''' was also installed at Myrtle Beach, South Carolina's Hard Rock Park rock-and-roll theme park, which later became Freestyle Music Park before closing permanently in 2009.

2019 horror film

On February 19, 2019, Warner Bros. Television Group's Blue Ribbon Content division announced that it was collaborating with Blue Ice Pictures on producing a film adaptation of The Banana Splits television series collectively named The Banana Splits Movie, which would serve as an R-rated parody of slasher films. Danishka Esterhazy was hired to direct the film, based on a script written by Jed Elinoff and Scott Thomas. On June 13, 2019, Syfy Wire released the official trailer for the film."Syfy basically turned the kids show Banana Splits into a Five Nights at Freddy's movie" from Polygon (June 13, 2019) 

Jellystone!

The Banana Splits appear in Jellystone! which was released HBO Max on July 29, 2021 with Fleegle voiced by Paul F. Tompkins, Bingo voiced by Jim Conroy, and Drooper voiced by show creator C. H. Greenblatt. They are portrayed as cartoonishly effective criminals and the enemies of El Kabong.

Home media
On September 21, 2009, Warner Home Video released the complete first season on DVD in Region 2. The six-disc set consists of 36 edited half-hour episodes of The Banana Splits and Friends Show'' as aired on Cartoon Network and Boomerang. The series was also released on VHS.

See also
 List of works produced by Hanna-Barbera Productions
 List of Hanna-Barbera characters

References

External links
 
 
 
 Interview with Shirley Hillstrom (now Sheri Freedman), who played Charley the Messenger of the Sour Grapes Bunch

 
1968 American television series debuts
1970 American television series endings
1960s American animated television series
1970s American animated television series
1960s American children's comedy television series
1970s American children's comedy television series
1960s American musical comedy television series
1970s American musical comedy television series
American children's animated comedy television series
American children's animated fantasy television series
American children's animated musical television series
American television shows featuring puppetry
American television series with live action and animation
Fictional musical groups
English-language television shows
NBC original programming
Television shows adapted into comics
Television shows adapted into films
Television series by Hanna-Barbera
Television series by Warner Bros. Television Studios
Television shows about apes
Television shows about dogs
Television series about elephants
Television series about lions
Fictional quartets